Henry Brebner (7 December 1883 – 14 January 1930) was a cricketer. He played in one first-class match for British Guiana in 1903/04.

See also
 List of Guyanese representative cricketers

References

External links
 

1883 births
1930 deaths
Cricketers from British Guiana